Leendert "Leo" Visser (born 13 January 1966) is a Dutch former speed skater, who in 1989 won the World Allround championships and European championships.

At the 1988 Olympics in Calgary he won a silver medal in the 5000 m and a bronze medal in the 10 000 meter. Four years later, at the 1992 Olympics in Albertville, Visser won a bronze medal in both the 1,500 and the 5,000 metres, behind Norwegians Johann Olav Koss and Geir Karlstad.

Nationally, he won the allround titles in 1988, 1989 and 1991, as well as four distance titles.

After his career as a speed skater, Visser became a pilot and he is now captain on the Boeing 777 for Dutch airline KLM. In 2002, he was the chef de mission for the Dutch Olympic team. His wife, Sandra Voetelink, is also a former Olympic speed skater.

Records

Personal records

Source:

Visser has a score of 159.287 points on the Adelskalender

World records

Tournament overview

Source:

Medals won

Source: SpeedSkatingStats.com

References

External links
 http://www.speedskatingstats.com/index.php?file=skater&code=1966011301|title = Leo Visser |publisher = speedskatingstats.com |access-date = 28 January 2021}}

1966 births
Living people
Dutch male speed skaters
Olympic silver medalists for the Netherlands
Olympic bronze medalists for the Netherlands
Olympic speed skaters of the Netherlands
Speed skaters at the 1988 Winter Olympics
Speed skaters at the 1992 Winter Olympics
People from Vlist
Olympic medalists in speed skating
World record setters in speed skating
Medalists at the 1988 Winter Olympics
Medalists at the 1992 Winter Olympics
World Allround Speed Skating Championships medalists
Sportspeople from South Holland